Tengai Amano (born 1960) is a playwright, director and the leader of the drama group called "Shonen-oja-kan".  He was born in Ichinomiya, Aichi prefecture, and graduated from the Department of History in Aichi Gakuin University.  In 1982, he founded "Shonen-oja-kan" in Nagoya.  The group started performing all over Japan, including Tokyo, Osaka and Nagoya since 1984.

As one of the busiest directors in the country, Amano has been active nationwide and has directed in numerous other drama groups as a guest, as well as writing and directing for his own theatre group for almost 25 years.  Besides drama, he has also produced dance, puppet shows, concerts, and fashion shows.  He has been involved in various kinds of stage arts for a long time.  He directs and writes the play "Yaji and Kita" for Kudan Project Production theatrical company.

Another of his life works is illustration; designing of posters, CD covers and book covers, and writing comics, and they are highly appreciated in all fields.  The flyer for "Yaji and Kita" was also designed by him.

Amano's creativity has extended in filmmaking.  In 1994, his directorial debut short film called "TWILIGHT" won the grand prize of the International Short Film Festival Oberhausen and the Melbourne International Film Festival (Short Film Programme) and with this movie he drew worldwide attention in the filmmaking field.  In 2006, he plans to make 2 movies from stories by Japanese writers, "Neji-shiki" by Yohiharu Tsuge and "Nigyo-no-nageki" by Jun'ichiro Tanizaki.

References 
 Yaji and Kita Promotional Brochure at Kuala Lumpur Performing Arts Centre.
 
 

People from Ichinomiya, Aichi
Japanese film directors
1960 births
Living people